Jânio Daniel do Nascimento Santos, simply known as Jânio (born 3 July 1991), is a Brazilian professional footballer who plays for Associação Atlética de Altos as a forward.

Club career
Born in Parnaíba, Piauí, Jânio graduated from Coritiba's youth setup, and was subsequently loaned to CFZ-DF, São Carlos, Ferroviário, J. Malucelli, Parnahyba, and Junior Team. After scoring five goals with the latter, he returned to Coxa in September 2013.

Jânio made his Coritiba – and Série A – debut on replacing Bill in a 0–3 away loss against Atlético Mineiro. He appeared in five matches during the campaign, as his side narrowly avoided relegation.

On 8 January 2014 Jânio signed for Criciúma. On 10 February he was loaned to Nacional-MG, appearing regularly and scoring three goals.

On 7 July 2014 Jânio joined Portuguesa on loan until the end of the year.

References

External links

Jânio at ZeroZero

1991 births
Living people
Sportspeople from Piauí
Brazilian footballers
Association football forwards
Campeonato Brasileiro Série A players
Campeonato Brasileiro Série B players
Campeonato Brasileiro Série C players
Campeonato Brasileiro Série D players
Coritiba Foot Ball Club players
Criciúma Esporte Clube players
Associação Portuguesa de Desportos players
Atlético Monte Azul players
Anápolis Futebol Clube players
Serra Talhada Futebol Clube players
Mogi Mirim Esporte Clube players
Parnahyba Sport Club players
Guarany Sporting Club players
Associação Atlética de Altos players